Ovtcharov, also transliterated Ovcharov, female form Ov(t)charova, is a Russian, Ukrainian and Bulgarian surname.

Notable people with this surname include:

 Anna Ovcharova (born 1996), Russian figure skater
 Dimitrij Ovtcharov (born 1988), Ukrainian-born German table tennis player
 Emil Ovtcharov (born 1973), Bulgarian footballer
 Jenny Ovtcharov (born 1988), Swedish table tennis player
 Lyubov Ovcharova (born 1995), Russian freestyle wrestler
 Nikolay Ovcharov (born 1957), Bulgarian archaeologist
 Peter Ovtcharov (born 1981), Russian pianist
 Rumen Ovtcharov (born 1952), Bulgarian engineer and politician
 Yuriy Ovcharov (born 1966), Soviet footballer and Ukrainian coach